Deorar is a village in Jagdishpur block of Bhojpur district in Bihar, India. As of 2011, its population was 3,080, in 548 households.

References 

Villages in Bhojpur district, India